Live at the Roxy 9.25.14 (or Live at the Roxy 25.9.14 outside the United States) is a live album and DVD by English-American guitarist Slash, featuring vocalist Myles Kennedy and backing band The Conspirators (bassist Todd Kerns, drummer Brent Fitz and rhythm guitarist Frank Sidoris).

Recorded at the Roxy Theatre in West Hollywood, California on September 25, 2014, it was released on June 15, 2015 by Armoury Records (album) and Eagle Rock Entertainment (DVD). The latter, said Slash, "really captures the energy and the chaos that comes with that gritty kind of gig."

Background
The album's release date, artwork and track listing were announced in March 2015. The album documents one of the first live shows following the release of the collaborative's second studio album, World on Fire. It features songs from throughout Slash's career, including all three of his solo albums and hits originally by Guns N' Roses and Velvet Revolver.

Promotion and release
Two weeks before the album's release, a live video "World on Fire" was released as a teaser. Live at the Roxy 9.25.14 was released in Europe on June 15, 2015 and in North America on June 16, 2015. The album was released as a double CD and a triple vinyl LP, while the video was released on DVD and Blu-ray, featuring 5.1-channel surround sound. Both were also released as digital downloads.

Track listings

Live album

Video

Personnel
Slash – lead guitar, slide guitar, acoustic guitar, backing vocals
Myles Kennedy – lead vocals, rhythm guitar
Frank Sidoris – rhythm guitar, backing vocals
Todd Kerns – bass, lead vocals, backing vocals
Brent Fitz – drums, backing vocals
Production
Chad Bamford – mixing
Mazen Murad – mastering

Reception

Charts

References

Slash (musician) albums
2015 live albums
2015 video albums
Live video albums
Albums recorded at the Roxy Theatre